James Campbell (February 19, 1814 – January 16, 1883) was a member of the Wisconsin State Assembly.

Biography
Campbell was born in Susquehanna County, Pennsylvania in 1814. In 1835, he moved to Green County, Wisconsin. He became a railroad company president and owner. Campbell died in 1883.

Political career
Campbell was a member of the Assembly in 1861, where he chaired the committee on claims. He was a Republican.

References

External links

People from Susquehanna County, Pennsylvania
People from Green County, Wisconsin
Businesspeople from Wisconsin
Republican Party members of the Wisconsin State Assembly
1814 births
1883 deaths
19th-century American politicians
19th-century American businesspeople